Petter Øverby (born 26 March 1992) is a Norwegian handball player for THW Kiel and the Norwegian national team.

He competed at the 2016 European Men's Handball Championship.

References

External links
 
 
 Petter Øverby at the Norwegian Handball Federation 
 
 

1992 births
Living people
Norwegian male handball players
Sportspeople from Kongsvinger
Expatriate handball players
Norwegian expatriate sportspeople in Germany
Handball-Bundesliga players
Handball players at the 2020 Summer Olympics
THW Kiel players
Olympic handball players of Norway